Ribosomal rescue factor may refer to:

 Alternative ribosome-rescue factor A
 Alternative ribosome-rescue factor B